Kevin Joss-Rauze (born 28 June 1988 in Gleizé) is a French basketball player who played for French League LNB Pro A club JDA Dijon Basket during the 2006-2009 seasons.

References

External links

1988 births
Living people
French men's basketball players
JDA Dijon Basket players
People from Gleizé
Sportspeople from Rhône (department)
21st-century French people